Fontiveros is a municipality in Spain in the Ávila province, in the autonomous community of Castile and León.  It comprises an area of approximately 2 square kilometers and according to the 2011 census (INE), the municipality has a population of 173 inhabitants.

It is famous for being the birthplace of Saint John of the Cross.

References

  Community website

Municipalities in the Province of Ávila